Martin Gallegos (born November 3, 1956) D.C. is a former California State Assembly man who served in the 57th district from 1994 until 2000.  A Democrat from Baldwin Park, he was the first chiropractor to serve in the Assembly. 

Gallegos attended East Los Angeles College, Occidental College, and Los Angeles College of Chiropractic. 

In 2001 he ran for state senate but lost in the primary to Gloria Romero. Gallegos currently serves as Senior Vice President, Health Policy and Communications for the Hospital Association of Southern California.

References

External Links
Join California Martin Gallegos

Living people
Members of the California State Assembly
American chiropractors
People from Baldwin Park, California
20th-century American politicians
21st-century American politicians
1956 births